The Women's Professional Billiard Association (WPBA) is a professional women's pool tour based in the United States. It was founded in 1976 as the Women's Professional Billiard Alliance by players Madelyn Whitlow and Palmer Byrd, and by Larry Miller (editor of the National Billiard News).

Top 32 Players (2019 End of Year Rankings) 

  Allison Fisher
  Brittany Bryant
  Jennifer Barretta
  Wei-Tzu Chien
  Kelly Fisher
  Line Kjørsvik
  Siming Chen
  Monica Webb
  Jia Li
  Melissa Little
  Janet Atwell
  Caroline Pao
  Gerda Gregerson
  Loree Jon Hasson
  Emily Duddy
  Teruko Cucculelli
  Gail Eaton
  Sara Miller
  Jasmin Ouschan
  Jenna Bishoff
  Kim Ga-Young
  Kristina Tkach
  April Larson
  Kim Newsome
  Bonnie Arnold
  Jessica Barnes
  Maureen Seto
  Cathy Metzinger
  Dawn Hopkins
  Ashley Burrows
  Eugenia Gyftopoulos
  Beth Fondell

References

External links
Official Page

Pool organizations
1976 establishments in the United States
Women in cue sports
Cue sports in the United States